Karagayevo (Qarağay) is a rural locality (a selo) and the administrative centre of Imendyashevsky Selsoviet, Gafuriysky District, Bashkortostan, Russia. The population was 297 as of 2010. There are 6 streets.

Geography 
Karagayevo is located 49 km northeast of Krasnousolsky (the district's administrative centre) by road. Nekrasovka is the nearest rural locality.

References 

Rural localities in Gafuriysky District